Girard Avenue is a major commercial and residential street in Philadelphia, Pennsylvania. For most of its length it runs east–west, but at Frankford Avenue it makes a 135-degree turn north. Parts of the road are signed as U.S. Route 13 and U.S. Route 30.

Route description
Girard Avenue begins in West Philadelphia at 67th Street, runs east through the Carroll Park neighborhood and the Centennial District, crosses the Schuylkill River via the Girard Avenue Bridge, and continues through East Fairmount Park and across North Philadelphia to Frankford Avenue in the Fishtown neighborhood. At Frankford Avenue it makes a 135-degree turn to the north and becomes East Girard Avenue, running parallel to the Delaware River until it ends at Richmond Street.
East–west section: 6.8 miles (10.94 km).
Northeast–southwest section: 1 mile (1.61 km).

History

Girard Avenue was named for banker Stephen Girard (1750–1831) – at his death, the richest man in the United States – who directed that his fortune be used to found a trade school for orphaned boys. 

The first "Girard Avenue" was a 3-block street in North Philadelphia, between the 1800-block of Ridge Avenue and Corinthian Avenue, approaching the under-construction Girard College (confirmed by 1845). By 1852, the avenue had been extended west to 33rd Street; and in 1855, the timber-arched Girard Avenue Bridge carried it over the Schuylkill River and into West Philadelphia. To the east: In 1858, the name "Girard Avenue" was adopted for the existing Franklin Street, that ran east–west between 6th Street and Frankford Avenue; and for the existing Prince Street, that ran northeast-southwest between Frankford Avenue and Norris Street. The 12-block gap between 6th and 18th Streets was filled in before the Civil War. The West Philadelphia section of the avenue was extended to 64th Street in 1868; and to 67th Street in 1936.

In 1844, the area surrounding 2nd Street and Franklin Street (later Girard Avenue) was the site of several days of anti-Catholic nativist riots. Beginning May 3, the anti-immigrant American Republican Party held rallies in the Irish Catholic neighborhood of Kensington, provoking violence from its residents. Nativists responded by vandalizing houses and businesses owned by Catholics. Residents defended themselves with guns. Following several deaths, the Pennsylvania militia took control, but nativists returned in even larger numbers. The rioting reached its peak on May 8, when St. Michael's Church and its rectory, a Catholic school, and dozens of houses and businesses were burned. As the state militia struggled to regain control in Kensington, another nativist mob burned St. Augustine's Church in the Old City neighborhood. In all, more than 14 people were killed, an estimated 50 were injured, and more than 200 were forced to flee their homes. The Kensington riots may have been more anti-Irish than anti-Catholic — the nativists did not attack the German Catholic church under construction at 5th Street and (what would become) Girard Avenue.

Landmarks

North Philadelphia
The major landmark of Girard Avenue in North Philadelphia is Girard College, a boarding school for underprivileged children. The avenue merges with South College Avenue between 19th and 25th Streets to bypass the school's 43 acre (17 ha) campus. Girard Avenue Historic District – located between the school and Broad Street – features architecturally significant residential and religious buildings. Girard Avenue West Historic District – located between the school and 29th Street – features architecturally significant commercial and residential buildings. Brewerytown Historic District – located between 30th Street and East Fairmount Park – features architecturally significant residential and industrial buildings. 

Girard Avenue east of Broad Street was a major shopping and entertainment district for lower North Philadelphia. Most of the late-19th and early-20th century theaters have been demolished, and surviving ones have been converted to other uses.

St. Peter the Apostle Church, at 5th Street, houses the National Shrine of Saint John Neumann (1811–1860), the fourth Bishop of Philadelphia and the first American man to be canonized as a Roman Catholic saint. The Church of the Gesu, at 18th Street, built as a neighborhood Catholic church, now serves as the chapel for Saint Joseph's Preparatory School. The Green Hill Presbyterian Church, between 16th and 17th Streets, a Gothic Revival church that pre-dated development of the area, was demolished in 2009 following decades of neglect. 

Medical facilities include the Girard Medical Center, at 8th Street and the Philadelphia Nursing Home, at 21st Street, is built on the former site of the Mary J. Drexel Home.

Hatfield House, at 33rd Street, is a colonial villa built in 1760, with Greek Revival additions from 1838. In 1930, it was relocated from Nicetown to East Fairmount Park. The current Girard Avenue Bridge (1972) is the third bridge over the Schuylkill River at that location. It incorporates some of the decorative ironwork from the second bridge (1874).

West Philadelphia
Landmarks of Girard Avenue in West Philadelphia include the Philadelphia Zoo, at 34th Street; the Letitia Street House, relocated from Old City to West Fairmount Park in 1883 (under the mistaken belief that it had been the residence of Pennsylvania's founder William Penn), near 35th Street; Smith Memorial Arch, a Civil War monument and the gateway to West Fairmount Park, near 41st Street; Memorial Hall, the art gallery from the 1876 Centennial Exposition, now home to the Please Touch Museum, near 42nd Street; and Old Cathedral Cemetery, at 48th Street. 

The Stephen Smith Home for the Aged, at 44th Street, a nursing home built by Quakers in 1871 to provide care for infirmed African Americans (including Civil War veterans), was demolished in 2009.

Fishtown
The Kensington National Bank (1877, Frank Furness, architect), at Frankford Avenue, is still in use as a bank. The Green Tree Tavern (1845, Joseph Singerly, architect), at Marlborough Street, is on the National Register of Historic Places. The First Presbyterian Church of Kensington (1857, Samuel Sloan, architect), at Columbia Avenue, survives, although its tall steeple has been removed.

Transportation

The Girard Avenue Trolley (SEPTA Route 15) follows a circuit from West Philadelphia to Kensington. A trolley begins the route at the Haddington Loop at 63rd Street, runs on the eastbound tracks along Girard Avenue, crosses the Girard Avenue Bridge, continues across North Philadelphia to Frankford Avenue, makes a 45-degree turn onto East Girard Avenue, follows that for a mile (East Girard Avenue ends), and completes the route along Richmond Street. At Westmoreland Street, the trolley makes a 180-degree turn around the Richmond-Westmoreland Streets Loop, and begins a return on the westbound tracks.

In 1901, the Grand Avenue trolley had about 8 million passengers on it in Guillard Avenue . This double than 1902 and back in 1903 this almost had around 940 million passengers on the train. 

The Girard Subway Station, part of the Broad Street Line, is located beneath the intersection of Broad Street and Girard Avenue.

The Girard El Station, part of an elevated section of the Market–Frankford Line, is located above the intersection of Front Street and Girard Avenue.

U.S. Route 13 runs northward along 34th Street (by the Philadelphia Zoo), merges with Girard Avenue to cross the Schuylkill River (via the Girard Avenue Bridge), then splits to continue northward along 33rd Street.

The proposed Girard Avenue Expressway – a below-grade superhighway that would have connected Interstate 95 (Delaware Expressway) with Interstate 76 (Schuylkill Expressway) and continued through West Philadelphia to the city line – was abandoned in 1977 following public opposition.

Gallery

See also
National Register of Historic Places listings in North Philadelphia
National Register of Historic Places listings in Northeast Philadelphia
National Register of Historic Places listings in West Philadelphia
List of richest Americans in history

References

External links

Streets in Philadelphia
U.S. Route 13
U.S. Route 30